The Republic of Korea Reserve Forces (ROKRF; ; Hanja: 大韓民國 豫備軍, Daehanminguk Yebigun), also known as the ROK Reserve Forces, is the 3,100,000-strong reserve force of South Korea.

There are two major branches of the Reserve Forces: the Mobilization Reserve Forces (Korean: 동원예비군, Hanja: 動員豫備軍; Dongwon Yebigun) and the Homeland Reserve Forces (Korean: 향토예비군, hanja: 鄕土豫備軍; Hyangto Yebigun), a Home Guard type force. Soldiers who have completed their service in the Republic of Korea Armed Forces are automatically transferred to the Reserve Forces and must first serve 4 years in the Mobilization Reserve and then 4 years as an Homeland Reservist. During wartime, about 5 divisions would be formed under the Mobilization Reserves, and deployed to the war zone to provide support and regional stabilization. In the meantime, the Homeland Reserve would defend the homeland from any possible attacks from the enemy.

History 
The Homeland Reserve Force was established in April 1968 as part of a nationwide program to increase emergency defense capabilities in response to increased North Korean infiltration. In January 1968, a North Korean commando unit infiltrated Seoul and attacked the Blue House Presidential residence in an attempt to assassinate South Korean President Park Chung Hee. That same month, two additional North Korean commando units launched attacks on towns on the Korean east coast in attempts to create an insurgency.

Civil Defense 
In 1980 there were over 90,000 civil defense personnel in the country. By 1990 there were more than 3.5 million civil defense personnel in reserve. Their missions included air raid defense, search and rescue missions, building and road repair.

Equipment

Small Arms 
 Daewoo K2
 M16A1
 M1 Garand

Vehicles 
 M113
 M48A3K

See also 
 Military reserve force
 National Defense Corps incident
 Republic of Korea Armed Forces
 Republic Of Korea Civil Defense Corps

References

External links 
  (In Korean)
 Globalsecurity on Homeland Reserve Forces
 Federation of American Scientists on HRF

Military of South Korea
Reserve forces